Nigerian Breweries Plc, is the largest brewing company in Nigeria. It serves the Nigerian market and West Africa.

History

Early years 
The idea to establish a brewery in Lagos was first promoted by Frank Samuel of UAC prior to World War II. But it was not until the war ended that concrete steps were taken to kick start such a project. Market leaders in the sector were all imported brands with the absence of a locally produced beer. UAC did not have a technical history in beer-making, leading the firm to enter into a technical agreement with Heineken and investments from other merchandise companies in Nigeria including John Holt, GBO, SCOA, CFAO and UTC who all took some equity interest in the new company. Nigerian Breweries was incorporated in 1946.

Construction of the brewery began at Iganmu, Lagos in 1947 and was completed in 1949. The first bottle of its brand, the STAR Lager, rolled off the bottling lines of its Lagos brewery in June 1949. NBL utilized consumer market research to understand the demands of the market and developed a marketing strategy around STAR Lager that used advertisements to show a link between drinking beer and modernity. It was one of the early companies to use sophisticated market research skills and to heavily advertise a Nigerian brand.

Development
Star attained market leadership in 1960 which created a need to build more factories in Nigeria. To get products to consumers, the company gave rights to sell its brand to select distributors and built depots at strategic locations within the country. As the company expanded into other regions, it established more breweries such as Aba Brewery in 1957 and Kaduna Brewery in 1963. By 1971, the company was one of the largest industries within the country in terms of capital investment. In 1982, another brewery was added in Ibadan. In September 1993, the company acquired its fifth brewery in Enugu, and in October 2003, its sixth brewery, sited at Ameke in Enugu. Ama Brewery began brewing on the 22 March 2003 and at 3 million hectolitres is the largest brewery in Nigeria.

In addition, NBL introduced assorted non-alcoholic mineral and flavored drinks under Rainbow brand that included, Krola, Tip Top Tonic Water and Sundowner soda water. It also introduced Gulder into the market and acquired rights to market Schweppes bitter lemon in the country. In 1972, it sold its non-alcoholic drink franchise.

In the 1980s, NBL gradually increased its market share of the alcoholic beverage market at the expense of smaller breweries. In 1988, NBL facilities had to undergo a conversion process when the government banned imports of barley. The firm employed Heineken's technical assistance with the conversion process and also established a grain farm in Niger State to supply locally produced grains for the breweries.

21st century
In 2010, NBL acquired beer factories from Sona Group makers of maltonic malt drink and franchise owners of Goldberg beer. The factories included Sona Breweries at Ota and Kaduna and Life Breweries at Onitsha. In 2014, the firm merged with Consolidated Breweries,  producers of 33 export and Williams Dark Ale, a merger led by the company's leading shareholder Heineken.

In December 2018, a Nigerian court ruled that Nigerian Breweries misled its consumers by selling Amstel Malt as a low-sugar product, which was an inaccurate statement. In March 2019, a Nigerian Federal High Court dismissed Nigerian Breweries' suit against the National Lottery Regulatory Commission (filed in 2018) which asked the Court to look into the authority of the Lottery Commission regarding sales promotion to consumers. Nigerian Breweries had been nailed by the Lottery Commission for running illegal lottery operations as part of a marketing promotion. In 2019, the journalists Olivier van Beemen and Femke van Zeijl won a De Tegel prize for their revelations about Nigerian Breweries' high-end corruption.

In December 2020, Nigerian Breweries launched the tequila-flavored beer Desperados. In August 2021, Hans Essaadi became the new CEO of Nigerian Breweries.

Products
Most of the products are packed in returnable bottles and all products are now available in cans. Fayrouz, Maltina and Amstel Malta are also produced in P.E.T Bottles

The company's head office is located in Lagos.

Alcoholic beverages
Star Lager (launched in 1949) Pale Lager
Gulder lager beer (1970) Pale Lager
Legend Extra Stout (1992) 6.5% ABV Extra Stout
Heineken Lager (June 1998) Premium Lager
Tiger Premium Lager Beer (2018)
Goldberg Lager (October 2011)
Life Continental Lager (October 2011)
Star Lite Lager (February 2014) Pale Lager
33 Export Lager (January 2015)
Williams Dark Ale (January 2015)
Turbo King Stout (January 2015)
More Lager (January 2015) 
Star Radler (July 2015) - now in two varieties, Citrus and Red Fruits
Desperados (December 2020) Tequila- Flavoured Pale Lager
Ace Rhythm (September 2015)
Strongbow Cider (November 2015)

Alcohol-free drinks
Maltina (1976). (Originally launched as a classic malt drink, now being made in three variants -  Maltina Classic, Maltina Vanilla, and Maltina Pineapple) 
Amstel Malta  (1994).
Amstel Malta Ultra (2020)
Fayrouz, in pear, pineapple and exotic flavour (2006)
Climax Energy drink(2010)
Malta Gold (October 2011)
Himalt (January 2015)

See also

 List of beer and breweries in Nigeria

References

External links 
Official website

Breweries in Nigeria
Food and drink companies based in Lagos
Manufacturing companies based in Lagos
Heineken subsidiaries
Food and drink companies established in 1946
1946 establishments in Nigeria
Nigerian subsidiaries of foreign companies